Norman Leonard Warren (19 July 1934 – 19 June 2019) was an Anglican priest and author.

He was born in London, England and educated at Dulwich College and Corpus Christi College, Cambridge Ordained in 1961, he began his ministry with a curacy in Bedworth. He held incumbencies in Leamington Priors and Morden; and was the Rural Dean of Merton. He was collated Archdeacon of Rochester in 1989 until his retirement in 2000.

His simple evangelistic tract Journey into Life, first issued in 1964, became a best-seller, with worldwide sales of 30 million.

References

1934 births
2019 deaths
People educated at Dulwich College
Alumni of Corpus Christi College, Cambridge
Archdeacons of Rochester